Boffa is a surname of Italian origin, believed to have been a nickname for a person who suffered from shortness of breath, or breathed rapidly or heavily (from the Old Italian boffare "to pant", "to puff"). The name is common in Malta, although it did not appear in the Status Animarum (diocesan census) of 1687 and is believed to have been absent from Malta at that time, and reintroduced at a later stage.

People with the surname Boffa include:
Ernest Joseph Boffa (1904–2004), a Canadian bush pilot
Menato Boffa (born 1930), an Italian racing driver
Sir Paul Boffa, OBE (1890–1962), Prime Minister of Malta (1947–1950)
Stefania Boffa (born 1988), a Swiss tennis player

References

Surnames
Surnames of Italian origin